iKON 2018 Continue Tour is the first world tour by South Korean boy band iKON, in support of second studio album Return. The tour is set to visit South Korea, Taiwan, Thailand, Malaysia, Singapore, Philippines, Hong Kong, Indonesia and Australia, with more countries to be announced. The tour began on August 18, 2018 in Seoul at KSPO Dome

Background
On July 2, it was announced by YG Entertainment that iKON will held an Asia tour and will visit eight cities. It marks the group second Asia tour after their 2016 iKoncert 2016: Showtime Tour, during the time they did two years intensive touring mostly in Japan as they gathered around 800,000 fans. A series of teasers were released in July, revealed members thoughts on the upcoming world tour and reveling the concept of the tour is A Road with No End, which indicates iKON's future path.

On August, iKON announced that the tour will visit Australia for the first time, with two shows in Sydney and Melbourne.

Concerts dates

References

2018 concert tours
2019 concert tours
Concert tours of Asia
IKon concert tours